Mary Coon Walters (January 29, 1922 – April 4, 2001) was the first female New Mexico Supreme Court justice, the first woman in New Mexico to be a district judge, and the first president of the New Mexico Women's Political Caucus.

Early life and military career 
Mary Coon Walters was born Mary Coon in Baraga, Michigan on January 29, 1922. In 1942, at the age of 20, she joined the Women Airforce Service Pilots. She was assigned to Hondo Army Air Field, flying a C-45 Expeditor as a transport pilot. Walters fought in the Korean War before leaving the military in 1955.

Later life 
As specified in the G.I. Bill, Walters gained entry into the University of New Mexico School of Law, and was admitted to the bar the same year that she graduated in 1962. Walters served as a delegate to the 1969 New Mexico Constitutional Convention. In 1972, Bruce King appointed Walters as the a Probate Judge in Albuquerque, New Mexico, making Walters the first woman in New Mexico to be a district judge. Walters became the first woman on the New Mexico Supreme Court when Toney Anaya appointed her to a term that began on December 13, 1984, and she was re-elected to a term that began on January 1, 1984. She was also the first president of the New Mexico Women's Political Caucus. She was in the first group of women inducted into the New Mexico Women's Hall of Fame in 1986.

Death and legacy 

Walters died on April 4, 2001.  A historical marker recognizing her contributions was erected at the intersection of Tucker Avenue NE and Yale Boulevard NE, in Albuquerque, New Mexico. In 2007, the New Mexico Supreme Court made her an honorary Chief Justice of the New Mexico Supreme Court and ordered her portrait be displayed in the New Mexico Supreme Court Building inside the Hall of Chief Justices.

See also 
 List of first women lawyers and judges in New Mexico

References 

1922 births
2001 deaths
Justices of the New Mexico Supreme Court
20th-century American judges
Women Airforce Service Pilots personnel
People from Baraga County, Michigan
University of New Mexico School of Law alumni
20th-century American women judges
Military personnel from Michigan